Jon F. Vein is an American business executive, entrepreneur and active member of his local, state and national communities. He has worked in a number of industries, from aerospace and technology to entertainment and the law, as well as in the fields of software and marketing.

Early life
Vein was born to an American Jewish family in Los Angeles, California. Raised in Encino, California, he attended both The Harvard School for Boys in North Hollywood, California and Birmingham High School in Van Nuys, California. At Birmingham High School he served as both Senior Class President and Student Body President. In his senior year of high school he was recognized as a Youth of the Year for the City of Los Angeles. Vein went on to the University of California, Berkeley where he double-majored in Electrical Engineering-Computer Science and Materials Science Engineering, graduating with highest honors). Jon went on to attend The Harvard Law School, where he won the Williston Contract Drafting and Negotiation competition and served as the Class of 1989's First Class Marshall, graduating cum laude. He received his Juris Doctor degree from the Harvard Law School in 1989.

Career
Vein co-founded and served as the co-Chief Executive Officer of MarketShare, a cloud-based marketing analytics company based in Westwood, alongside Wes Nichols. Jon served as its co-chief executive officer and managing partner until MarketShare was acquired in December, 2015 by Neustar for US$450 million in 2015. The acquisition was one of the largest amongst Los Angeles-founded companies.

Jon is also an Emmy Award-winning producer and winner of the 2016 Ernst & Young Entrepreneur of the Year Award. The Los Angeles Business Journal named Vein as one of the 500 Most Influential People in Los Angeles. Jon holds several patents including one for in-vitro meat.

Early career
Vein began his professional career working at technology companies, from Teledyne Relays to Hughes Aircraft, where he worked on the "Star Wars" program under President Ronald Reagan. He went on to co-found Dern & Vein, an entertainment law firm based in Los Angeles with Dixon Dern.

Vein left Dern & Vein to join Film Roman, an animation production company based in Los Angeles, where he held a number of positions, including Chief Operating Officer and interim Chief Executive Officer. At Film Roman he produced a number of well-known television shows, including King of the Hill and The Simpsons, the latter of which resulted in his winning an Emmy Award in 2001.

Vein subsequently served as the chief operating officer of Artist Management Group and the Artist Production Group, two companies based in Los Angeles and founded by Michael Ovitz. As COO, Vein oversaw all divisions, including talent, literary, animation, sports, music, publishing, and feature film production and helped negotiate Artist Management Group's acquisition by The Firm, Inc. in 2002.

Organizations
Vein is a member of the Los Angeles Chapter of the World Presidents Organization Gold. He was previously a member of the Golden West Chapter of the Young Presidents Organization, where he served as the Chairman of that chapter. Jon is also a member of the California State Bar Association.

Political engagement
Jon served as a member of Barack Obama's National Finance Committees for both the 2008 and 2012 presidential campaigns, as well as on the National Finance Committee for Hillary Clinton's candidacy for president in 2016. He has also held several fundraisers for national, state, and local candidates. Jon served as a delegate to the Democratic National Convention in 2016, and is a member of the Board of Trustees for the Center of American Progress.

Public service
Vein has worked with a number of public service, professional and charitable organizations.

He has served as the president of the Los Angeles Convention and Tourism Development Board since 2013, and as the head of the Brand LA initiative for the Mayor's Fund in Los Angeles. Vein is also a member of the Board of Trustees for the California Science Center, the board of the California Cultural and Historic Endowment, the board of directors of the Los Angeles Philharmonic, the US Fund for UNICEF's Southern California Region (where he serves as co-President), and the University of Haifa.

Furthermore, he is a member of the board of the Los Angeles Police Foundation, the Los Angeles Business Council, and the advisory boards of the Los Angeles Sports & Entertainment Commission, and Step Up on Second. He also belongs to the Program Advisory Committee member for Fremont College, the Hancock Park Homeowners’ Association, and the Pacific Council for International Policy.

Personal life
Vein is married to Ellen Goldsmith-Vein, the co-founder of the Gotham Group, a talent agency and production company. They have a son, Jack, and a daughter, Caroline. They reside in Hancock Park, Los Angeles, California. The Vein family hosted a fundraiser for Democratic presidential candidate Hillary Clinton's 2016 presidential campaign on February 22, 2016.

References

External links

MarketShare Official Website

Living people
Businesspeople from Los Angeles
UC Berkeley College of Engineering alumni
Harvard Law School alumni
California lawyers
Entertainment lawyers
American company founders
American chief executives
Emmy Award winners
1963 births
American entertainment lawyers